Lobachevsky is a rural locality (a khutor) in Verkhnerechenskoye Rural Settlement, Nekhayevsky District, Volgograd Oblast, Russia. The population was 123 as of 2010.

Geography 
Lobachevsky is located on the bank of the Tishanka River, 8 km west of Nekhayevskaya (the district's administrative centre) by road. Avraamovsky is the nearest rural locality.

References 

Rural localities in Nekhayevsky District